London Buses route 969 is a Transport for London contracted mobility bus route in London, England. Running between Roehampton Vale and Whitton, it is operated by Abellio London.

History 
Bus route 969 is the last of Transport for London's mobility bus routes (allocated numbers above 900) to continue operating. It has the highest route number of all buses in London.

Route 
The route runs from a supermarket in Roehampton Vale to Whitton, via Richmond. It operates one return journey on Tuesdays and Fridays only.

References 

Bus routes in London